West Kenya Sugar Football Club is an association football club based in Kakamega, Kenya. The club currently competes in the Kenyan National Super League. The club was known as Kabrass United Football Club until July 2012.

History
The club was founded in 2007 by Matthew Dane Norman and Antony Golec, and has an association with Aldershot Town F.C.

Stadium
The team currently plays its home games at the 5,000-capacity Bukhungu Stadium.

References

External links 
West Kenya complain over keeper Matasi

Kenyan National Super League clubs
FKF Division One clubs
Football clubs in Kenya
Works association football clubs in Kenya